Anesti Arapi (born 6 July 1963) is an Albanian retired footballer, who played the majority of his career as a goalkeeper for Flamurtari Vlorë.

Club career
A soon as Albanians were free to leave the country after the end of the communist era, Arapi moved abroad to play alongside Flamurtari teammate and compatriot Sokol Kushta in neighboring Greece for Iraklis Saloniki. He returned to Flamurtari however after just one season in Saloniki.

UEFA Cup matches against Barcelona
As Flamurtari's reserve goalkeeper, Arapi was deemed too young and inexperienced to play in the 1986–87 UEFA Cup against Spanish giants FC Barcelona after their first goalkeeper Luan Birçe was not allowed to travel so the football federation ordered Lokomotiva Durrës keeper Artur Lekbello to stand in at the club for a season. Arapi did however play when they met Barcelona again in the 1987–88 UEFA Cup.

International career
He made his debut for Albania in a November 1990 European Championship qualification match against France and earned his second and final cap in a 0-9 defeat by Spain in December in the same year.

Honours
Albanian Superliga: 1
 1991

References

External links

1963 births
Living people
Association football goalkeepers
Albanian footballers
Albania international footballers
Flamurtari Vlorë players
Iraklis Thessaloniki F.C. players
Kategoria Superiore players
Super League Greece players
Albanian expatriate footballers
Expatriate footballers in Greece
Albanian expatriate sportspeople in Greece